Bashir Ahmed (11 November 1939 – 19 April 2014) was a Bangladeshi playback singer who started his career from Pakistan film industry. Born in Kolkata, West Bengal, he migrated to Dhaka, East Bengal after the Partition period in 1960 and started his singing career. He is known as East Pakistan's Ahmed Rushdi because his singing style is inspired by Ahmed Rushdi. He was awarded Ekushey Padak in 2005 by the Government of Bangladesh and Bangladesh National Film Award for Best Male Playback Singer for his performance in the film Kokhono Megh Kokhono Bristi (2003).

Career
Bashir Ahmed was born in Calcutta in 1939. He was accepted as a pupil by Ustad Vilayat Hussain at the age of 15. Later, he came to Bombay, and became a student of Ustad Bade Ghulam Ali Khan.

Ahmed performed along with Geeta Dutt. Around the 1960s, when the film producer and owner of Gulistan Cinema Hall, Dossani invited Talat Mahmood and Ahmed to East Pakistan to perform, after their tour of Chittagong and Mymensingh, Mahmood returned to India but Ahmed decided to stay back.

In Dhaka, his mentor and brother-in-law, Ishrat Kalkatvi introduced him to Robin Ghosh. Kalkatvi was writing songs for the film Talash (1963), although eventually, Suroor Barabankvi contributed more songs to the film. Ghosh was making tunes for the film. Ahmed sang some numbers for Talash, including the soft romantic one, titled "Kuch Apni Kahiye Kuch Meri Suniye, Yeh Sham Yeh Tanhai Yun Chup To Na Rahiye". Ahmed sang another song titled Main Rickshawalla Matwala. He had another duet in the film, "Tum Bhi Haseen Dil Bhi Jawan".

Ahmed was also a poet and a lyricist, with a pseudonym B. A. Deep. Film-maker, Mustafiz, they contacted Bashir and asked him to write a song for his film, Saagar (1965 film), which he did, titled Ja dekha pyar tera, and sang it too. Similarly in Robin Ghosh's another lilting offering, Karwan, in 1964, Bashir wrote and sang Jab Tum Akele Hoge Hum Yaad Aayenge. He wrote film songs, as B. A. Deep, and also continued to sing as Bashir Ahmed for films like Saagar, Karwan, Indhan, Milan (1964 film), Kangan, Darshan (1967), Soye nadiya Jaage Paani (1967) and Jahan Baje Shehnai (1968). The songs from the films were Yeh Sama Pyara Pyara,  Yeh Hawaein Thandi Tthandi (singer Mala), (Yeh mausam yeh mast nazare, pyar karo to inse karo), (Tumhare Liye Iss Dil Mein Itne Mohabbat Hai, Itne Mohabbat Kaun Karega Kahan Paoge Kis Dil Mein Hoge), (Din Raat Khayalon Mein Tujhe Yaad Karoonga, Par Naam Tera Leke Main Aawaz Na Doonga), (Hum Chale Chhor Kar Teri Mehfil Sanam,  Dil Kahin Na Kahin To Behal Jayega), (Gulshan Mein Baharon Mein Tu Hai), and (Chun Liya Ik Phool Ko), with Madam Noor Jahan.

In 1971, when the situation worsened in Pakistan, he was not encouraged in the industry as music directors considered him a pale version of Ahmed Rushdi (who remained the greatest singer in the history of Pakistani cinema) and the film Hill Station's songs, namely Mera Dil Na Jaane Kabse Tera Pyar Dhoondta Hai and Mere Seene Par Sar Rakhdo remain his only contributions in this period.

A film that was made on the Dhaka Debacle in the late 1970s, called Sangtarash, also included his numbers, namely Bol Zara Kuch Duniya Wale and Mukhre Mein Chand, but the film, despite pleadings of the film-maker to the military regime of Zia, remained unreleased. So, he went back to Bangladesh in 1975 and continued his music career there.

Personal life and death
Ahmed was married to Meena Bashir (Born:16 May, 1959 - Died: 8 August, 2014), a singer. Together they had a daughter, Humayra and a son, Raja Bashir.

Ahmed died on 19 April 2014, aged 74 at his residence in Mohammadpur, Dhaka, Bangladesh. He had been suffering from various diseases including cancer.

Film songs

Non-film songs

References

External links

1939 births
2014 deaths
Singers from Kolkata
20th-century Bangladeshi male singers
20th-century Bangladeshi singers
Pakistani playback singers
Best Male Playback Singer National Film Award (Bangladesh) winners
Recipients of the Ekushey Padak
Bangladeshi people of Indian descent